The technology in Star Trek has borrowed many ideas from the scientific world. Episodes often contain technologies named after real-world scientific phenomena, such as tachyon beams, baryon sweeps, quantum slipstream drives, and photon torpedoes. Some of the technologies created for the Star Trek universe were done so out of financial necessity. For instance, the transporter was created because the limited budget of Star Trek: The Original Series (TOS) in the 1960s did not allow expensive shots of spaceships landing on planets.

Discovery Channel Magazine stated that cloaking devices, faster-than-light travel, and dematerialized transport were only dreams at the time TOS was made, but physicist Michio Kaku believes all these things are possible. William Shatner, who portrayed James T. Kirk in TOS, believes this as well, and went on to co-write the book I'm Working on That, in which he investigates how Star Trek technology was becoming feasible.

Subspace
In the Star Trek fictional universe, subspace is a feature of space-time that facilitates faster-than-light transit, in the form of interstellar travel or the transmission of information. Faster-than-light warp drive travel via subspace obeys different laws of physics. Subspace has also been adopted and used in other fictional settings, such as the Stargate franchise, The Hitchhiker's Guide to the Galaxy series, the Bobiverse series, and Descent: Freespace.

In most Star Trek series, subspace communications are a means to establish nearly instantaneous contact with people that are light years away. The physics of Star Trek describes infinite speed (expressed as "warp factor 10") as an impossibility; as such, even subspace communications which travel at speeds over Warp 9.9 may take hours or weeks to reach certain destinations. One exception to this impossibility was in the Star Trek: Voyager episode "Threshold" where Lt. Paris breaks the Warp 10 barrier. In the Star Trek universe subspace signals do not degrade with the square of the distance as do other methods of communication utilizing conventional bands of the electromagnetic spectrum (i.e. radio waves), so signals sent from a great distance can be expected to reach their destination at a predictable time and with little relative degradation (barring any random subspace interference or spatial anomalies).

In the Star Trek franchise, subspace communications have a limit of just over 20 light years before they must be boosted, although this limitation has been ignored in several storylines.

Warp drive 

Warp drive is one of the fundamental features of the Star Trek franchise; in the first pilot episode of Star Trek: The Original Series, "The Cage", it is referred to as a "hyperdrive", with Captain Pike stating the speed to reach planet TalosIV as "time warp, factor 7". When beginning to explain travel times to the illusion survivors (before being interrupted by the sight of Vina), crewmember Jose Tyler stated that "the time barrier's been broken", allowing a group of interstellar travelers to return to Earth far sooner than would have otherwise been possible. Later in the pilot, when Spock is faced with the only action of escaping, he announces to the crew they have no choice but to leave, stating "Our time warp factor..." before the ship's systems start failing. In the second pilot for The Original Series, "Where No Man Has Gone Before", time was dropped from the speed setting with Kirk ordering speeds in the simple "ahead warp factor one" that became familiar from then on.

Working principle 

The basic functional principle of the warp drive in Star Trek is the same for all spaceships. A strong energy source, usually called a  warp core  or sometimes intermix chamber, generates a high-energy plasma. This plasma is transported to warp field generators via lines that are reminiscent of pipes. These generators are effectively coils in warp nacelles protruding from the spaceship. The warp nacelles generate a subspace field, the warp field or a warp bubble, which distort space-time and propels the bubble and spaceship in the bubble forward. That is similar to the Alcubierre drive, but with some exceptions as the maintenance of sub-light velocity and inertia. This means that a spaceship does not come to a complete standstill after the warp flight, but that superluminal and subluminal speeds flow directly into one another. It is also possible to ram another object at warp speed that is outside the warp bubble. This necessitates the existence of fictional deflector shields that protect the spacecraft from damage from collisions with interstellar dust particles and asteroids. And in episode By Inferno's Light it is mentioned that flying at warp speed inside a planetary system is not recommended.

The warp core can be designed in various forms. Humans and most of the other fictional races use a moderated reaction of antideuterium and deuterium with Dilithium. The Romulans, however, use artificial micro-black holes called quantum singularities.

Fictional history

The episode "Metamorphosis", from The Original Series, establishes a backstory for the invention of warp drive on Earth, in which Zefram Cochrane discovered the "space warp". Cochrane is repeatedly referred to afterwards, but the exact details of the first warp trials were not shown until the second Star Trek: The Next Generation movie, Star Trek: First Contact. The movie depicts Cochrane as having first operated a warp drive on Earth in 2063. This successful first trial led directly to first contact with the Vulcans.

It was also established that many other civilizations had warp drive before humans; First Contact co-writer Ronald D. Moore suggested Cochrane's drive was in some way superior to forms which existed beforehand, and was gradually adopted by the galaxy at large.

The following table shows the gradual evolution of the warp drive and the warp speeds of humanity and later the United Federation of Planets. For better comparison, the warp factors of the TNG scale, based on the values given in the book Star Trek Encyclopedia, have been converted to cubic warp factors from TOS.

Warp speeds

Original warp scale (The Original Series, The Animated Series, Enterprise, and Discovery)

The warp drive velocity in Star Trek is generally expressed in "warp factor" units, which—according to Star Trek Star Fleet Technical Manual—corresponds to the magnitude of the warp field. Achieving warp factor1 is equal to breaking the light barrier, while the actual velocity corresponding to higher factors is determined using an ambiguous formula. 
According to the Star Trek episode writer's guide for The Original Series, warp factors are converted to multiples of the speed of light by multiplication with the cubic function of the warp factor itself. Accordingly, "warp 1" is equivalent to the speed of light, "warp 2" is eight times the speed of light, "warp 3" is 27 times the speed of light, etc. Several episodes of The Original Series placed the Enterprise in peril by having it travel at high warp factors. However, the velocity (in present dimensional units) of any given warp factor is rarely the subject of explicit expression, and travel times for specific interstellar distances are not consistent through the various series. In the Star Trek: The Next Generation Technical Manual it was written that the real warp speed depends on external factors such as particle density or electromagnetic fields and only roughly corresponds with the calculated speed of current warp factor. The reference work Star Trek Maps established the theory of subspace (or warp) highways. In certain regions, a spaceship can fly at a multiple of the speed that corresponds to the current warp factor.

In The Original Series, warp factor6 was established as the common speed of the USS Enterprise NCC-1701. In some cases, the starship traveled at warp7 or above, but with risk of damaging the ship or the engines. Warp8 in The Original Series was the "never exceed" speed for the hulls and engines of Constitution-class starships. Warp6 was the maximum safe cruising speed for that vessel class.

Later on, a prequel series titled Star Trek: Enterprise describes the warp engine technology as a "Gravimetric Field Displacement Manifold" (Commander Tucker's tour, "Cold Front") and describes the device as being powered by a matter/anti-matter reaction which powers the two separate nacelles (one on each side of the ship) to create a displacement field. Enterprise, set in 2151 and onward, follows the voyages of the first human ship capable of traveling at warp factor 5.2, which under the old warp table formula (the cube of the warp factor times the speed of light), is about 140 times the speed of light (i.e., 5.2 cubed). In the series pilot episode "Broken Bow", Capt. Archer equates warp 4.5 to "Neptune and back [from Earth] in six minutes" (which would correspond to a distance of 547 light-minutes or 66 au, consistent with Neptune's being a minimum of 29 au distant from Earth).

Modified warp scale (The Next Generation, Deep Space Nine, Voyager, and Picard)

For Star Trek: The Next Generation and the subsequent series, Star Trek artist Michael Okuda drew up a new warp scale and devised a formula based on the original one but with an important difference: In the half-open interval from 9to 10, the exponentw increases toward infinity. Thus, in the Okuda scale, warp velocities approach warp 10 asymptotically. According to the Star Trek: The Next Generation Technical Manual there is no exact formula for this interval because the quoted velocities are based on a hand-drawn curve; what can be said is that at velocities greater than warp 9, the form of the warp function changes because of an increase in the exponent of the warp factorw. Due to the resultant increase in the derivative, even minor changes in the warp factor eventually correspond to a greater than exponential change in velocity. Warp factor 10 was set as an unattainable maximum (according to the new scale, reaching or exceeding warp 10 required an infinite amount of energy). This is described in Star Trek Technical Manuals as "Eugene's limit", in homage to creator/producer Gene Roddenberry.

As stated in the collection Star Trek Fact Files, no ship, including highly developed ships like the Borg cube, may exceed warp factor 9.99 with their normal warp drive. To achieve higher speeds, the use of transwarp technology is required.

Warp velocities

In the book Star Trek Encyclopedia and the compilation Star Trek Fact Files, some warp velocities are given directly. For comparison, the following table shows these values and also the calculated speeds of the original warp scale, the calculated speeds of a simplified Okuda scale and some canonical reference values for warp speeds from onscreen sources.

Transwarp
Transwarp generally refers to speeds and technologies that are beyond conventional warp drives. The warp drive has a natural physical or economical limit beyond which higher speeds are no longer possible. The reference work Star Trek Fact Files indicates this limit at warp factor 9.99. This is the highest conventional warp speed mentioned for a spaceship (Borg cube). Also in the episode Threshold (Star Trek Voyager) the warp factor 9.99 is suggested as the limit. This is the last warp factor mentioned before the leap takes place in the transwarp state.

In the book Star Trek: The Next Generation Technical Manual the authors describe the idea of transwarp: Finally, we had to provide some loophole for various powerful aliens like Q, who have a knack for tossing the ship million of light years in the time of a commercial break. .. This lets Q and his friends have fun in the 9.9999+ range, but also lets our ship travel slowly enough to keep the galaxy a big place, and meets the other criteria.

The transwarp concept itself is not tied to any particular technology or speed limit. Variants of transwarp are:

 Space folding
 coaxial warp drive 
 Rutian Inverter
 Sikanian spatial trajector 
 Hyperspace
 quantum slipstream
 Vaadwaur subspace corridors (underspace)
 Xindi subspace vortex
 Borg transwarp conduits
 Wormholes
 geodesic fold
 intermittent cyclical vortex / interspatial flexure
 spatial flexure
 spatial vortex

See also
 Ansible
 Time travel in fiction

Star Trek technologies
 Cloaking device
 Communicator (original seen in TOS; similar to the modern-day mobile phone)
 Holodeck
 Replicator
 Tractor beam
 Transporter
 Universal translator

References

Further reading
 
 
 
 
 Star Trek Inconsistencies. Ex Astris Scientia
 
 
 Mark E. Lasbury: The realization of Star Trek technologies. Springer, Cham 2017, .
 </ref>

External links
 

 
Physics in fiction
Faster-than-light communication
Fiction about invisibility